Events from the year 1616 in Ireland.

Incumbent
Monarch: James I

Events
February – Arthur Chichester, 1st Baron Chichester's term as Lord Deputy of Ireland is terminated. He has served since 1605.
July 2 – Sir Oliver St John is appointed Lord Deputy of Ireland. He served until 1622.

Births

Deaths
July 20 – Hugh O'Neill, 2nd Earl of Tyrone, led the resistance during the Nine Years War (b. c 1540).

References

 
1610s in Ireland
Ireland
Years of the 17th century in Ireland